The Men's Epee Team wheelchair fencing competition at the 2004 Summer Paralympics was held on 21 September at the Helliniko Fencing Hall.

The event was won by the team representing .

Results

Competition bracket

Classification 5-7

Team Lists

References

M